Paso Robles Joint Unified School District  is a public school district based in Paso Robles, northern San Luis Obispo County, California, United States.

References

External links
 

Paso Robles, California
School districts in San Luis Obispo County, California